Hassan Beyt Saeed (born 1990 in Susangerd, Iran) is an Iranian football forward player who currently plays for Sanat Naft Abadan in the Persian Gulf Pro League. Beyt Saeed was named the Azadegan League player of the season for the 2014–15 season.

Iran

Career

Foolad Novin
Beyt Saeed joined Foolad Novin in winter 2013. He was part of Foolad Novin in promoting to Azadegan League in 2014 and to Persian Gulf Pro League in 2015.

Esteghlal Khuzestan
He joined Esteghlal Khuzestan in summer 2015. He made his debut for Ahvazi side on 30 July 2015. He scored two goals on 6 August 2015 in a 2–1 victory against Persepolis.

Esteghlal
Beyt Saeed joined Esteghlal in July 2017. However, after a disappointing season, he left the club after 6 months and officially terminated his contract on 16 December 2017.

Foolad
Beyt Saeed joined Foolad on 18 December 2017.

Club career statistics

Honours

Club
 Jonoub Sousangerd
 Khouzestan Province League (1) : 2012-13
Foolad B
Azadegan League (1) : 2014–15

Esteghlal Khuzestan
Persian Gulf Pro League (1) : 2015–16

Individual
Azadegan League Player of the season (1) : 2014–15

References

External links
 persianleague.com
 ffiri.ir
 ifnam.com

1990 births
Living people
Iranian footballers
Persian Gulf Pro League players
Esteghlal Khuzestan players
Esteghlal F.C. players
Iranian Arab sportspeople
Association football midfielders
Sportspeople from Khuzestan province